Längenfeld is a municipality and a village the Imst (district) and is located 25 km southeast of Imst in the Ötztal valley, 14 km north of Sölden.

With an area size of 195.8 km2, 21 village parts and 4333 inhabitants it is the biggest location in the valley. Sights are the late Gothic-baroque church which was built in 1303. The main source of income is tourism.

Population

Gallery

References

External links

Cities and towns in Imst District